The Upstate New York Collegiate Hockey League is a college ice hockey league comprising teams from smaller colleges and universities in and near Upstate New York that is affiliated with the Collegiate Hockey Federation (CHF). The league is based in New York State and has a majority of teams competing in-state along with some from neighboring Pennsylvania and Vermont.

History 
The league was founded by Andrew Musto in 2006 with the purpose of creating a league that is a low-cost alternative to higher cost leagues. As of 2017 the league fee per team is $300. League fees are used for playoff ice time, referee fees, scorekeepers, and awards.

At the end of the 2016–17 season, Musto stepped down as commissioner and appointed Jon Marchese the new commissioner. The UNYCHL opened its 11th season with the biggest expansion in its history. The league grew to 23 teams with the additions of SUNY Albany, Gannon University, Mercyhurst University, Clarkson University, Niagara County Community College, Binghamton University and Syracuse University as well as the return of Alfred State College, Hilbert College and SUNY Canton.  In addition the league was organized into  three divisions based on geography to cut down travel.

Before the 2019–2020 season, the league left the ACHA and has joined the Collegiate Hockey Federation.

The league also organizes a second-tier league called UNYCHL Tier 2, which launched with the 2018–19 season. This tier is for new programs in an effort to "provide local area teams an avenue to play competitive hockey while minimizing budgetary impacts and reducing travel costs." UNYCHL T2 holds ten teams which compete among one another for a separate league championship.

Members

Tier 1

Tier 2

Former Members

Timeline

Seasons

2015 Playoffs

The 2015 UNYCHL Playoffs were played February 20–22 at the home rink of each #1 and #2 seeds and 27th and 28th at Holiday Twin Rinks in Cheektowaga, New York.

2016 Playoffs

2017 Playoffs

Awards

Coach of the Year

League MVP

Playoff MVP

Records

Team Records
Least Penalty Minutes in a Season
  60 - Skidmore College - 2015-2016
Team Goals Against Average in a Season
  2.50 - LeMoyne College - 2014-2015
Team Goals For in a Season
  123 - Hamilton College - 2014-2015

 These records began tracking at the beginning of the 2014 - 2015 season.

Individual Records
Most points in a Season
  42 - Matt Morgia - ACPHS - 2015-2016
Most Goals in a Season
  25 - Andrew Tullo - Union College - 2015-2016
Most Assists in a Season
  20 - Matt Morgia - ACPHS - 2015-2016

 These records began tracking at the beginning of the 2014 - 2015 season.

See also
 National Collegiate Hockey Association 
 National Association of Intercollegiate Hockey
 List of ice hockey leagues

References

College ice hockey conferences in the United States
Ice hockey in New York (state)
ACHA Division 2 conferences